"Picture Book" is a song by the English rock band the Kinks from their 1968 album The Kinks Are the Village Green Preservation Society. Written and sung by Ray Davies, the song's lyrics describe the experience of an ageing narrator flipping through a photo album reflecting on happy memories from "a long time ago". In continental Europe, the song was issued as the B-side of the album's lead single, "Starstruck", in November1968. The same single was issued in the United States in January1969, though it failed to appear in any charts.

While "Picture Book" remained obscure in the decades after its release, the song has subsequently become one of the Kinks' most popular songs, due in part to its usage in a 2004 advertisement for Hewlett-Packard and Green Day featuring the riff in their 2000 single "Warning". Retrospective commentators have described the song in favourable terms and consider it one of the song's central to Village Green concept. The song was covered by the Young Fresh Fellows in 1989.

Background and composition 

The Kinks' principal songwriter Ray Davies reflected in 2002 that when he wrote "Picture Book" he did not initially intend for the track to be a Kinks song given the personal content. It describes the singer's experience flipping through a photo album reflecting on happy memories. Musically, "Picture Book" is a pop song, and while its arrangement is cheerful, the lyrics do not directly describe happy memories, but instead the experience of a lonely ageing narrator looking at photographs from "a long time ago". The song features barbershop-like harmonies for a wordless vocal. Ray sings "scooby dooby doo" in reference to Frank Sinatra's 1966 single "Strangers in the Night", an improvisation Dave Davies remembered arising while the band worked on the song's harmonies and his brother Ray mocked his suggestion of a Jo Stafford-like jazz improvisation. The melody employs a four-note ascending guitar riff of E, A, D and G.

Later commentators typically compare "Picture Book" with "People Take Pictures of Each Other", another track on The Kinks Are the Village Green Preservation Society about photography. Author Thomas M. Kitts writes that "Picture Book" conveys ambiguity due to the discordance between its cheerful sound and the lyrics which instead recall "when you were just a baby, those days when you were happy, a long time ago". Kitts thinks the singer's suggestion that happiness is located in the past is a theme running throughout Village Green, and author Jon Savage considers the song one of the album's central statements, focusing around a wistful theme.

Recording 

The Kinks recorded "Picture Book" in May1968 in Pye Studio 2, one of two basement studios at Pye Records' London offices. Ray is credited as the song's producer, while Pye's in-house engineer Brian Humphries operated the four-track mixing console. The riff is played by electric, acoustic and bass guitar, and the song's distinct jangle-sound was achieved by Ray playing a twelve-string acoustic guitar. Mick Avory altered his drum sound by disengaging the snare.

Ray later said he had a defined sound in mind when he composed the song, and bassist Pete Quaife recalled the band recording multiple takes as Ray searched for his desired result. Unlike most of the album's songs, its mix emphasises the low-end, particularly Quaife's bass and Avory's drums, which critic Stewart Mason terms "cleverly sloppy".

Release and legacy 

"Picture Book" was among the tracks Ray sent to Reprise Records in June1968 for Four More Respected Gentlemen, a US-only album planned for late1968, though the project was aborted before its release. While the sessions for The Kinks Are the Village Green Preservation Society persisted through the summer of 1968, the Kinks mimed a performance of "Picture Book" for the BBC Two programme Colour Me Pop on 22 July. "Picture Book" was featured on both the twelve- and fifteen-track editions of Village Green, sequenced as the third track in both cases, and Pye released the fifteen-track edition in the United Kingdom on 22 November 1968. In his preview of the album for New Musical Express magazine, critic Keith Altham described "Picture Book" as a good example of the band's ability to extract a tinny' texture" from a guitar sound.

Accompanying Village Green release, "Starstruck" was issued as a single in continental Europe backed with "Picture Book" in November1968. As the B-side, "Picture Book" did not chart, but did appear on the Ultratip bubbling under chart in Belgium's French-speaking region of Wallonia. The single failed to chart in the US.

The American alternative rock band the Young Fresh Fellows covered "Picture Book" on their 1989 album This One's for the Ladies, a version Stewart Mason of AllMusic calls "endearingly sloppy". "Picture Book" remained an obscure song until its use in a 2004 commercial for Hewlett-Packard advertising digital cameras and their accessories. The song subsequently became one of the Kinks' most popular songs, something journalist Andy Price thinks was furthered by the American band Green Day using its opening riff in their 2000 single "Warning". In a retrospective assessment for AllMusic, Mason wrote the song's newfound attention is well deserved since its melody is one of Ray's best from that period, and Rolling Stone critic Rob Sheffield called it "the best photo-album song of the pre-Taylor Swift era", while acknowledging the darker undertone of the lyrics. In his ranking of the songs on Village Green, Billboard critic Morgan Enos placed it first in his list.

Personnel
According to band researcher Doug Hinman:

The Kinks
 Ray Davies lead vocal, twelve-string acoustic guitar; producer
 Dave Davies backing vocal, electric guitar
 Pete Quaife backing vocal, bass
 Mick Avory drums

Additional production
 Brian Humphries engineering

Notes

References

Citations

Bibliography

External links 
 

1968 songs
Songs written by Ray Davies
The Kinks songs
Pye Records singles
Song recordings produced by Ray Davies
Reprise Records singles
Songs about nostalgia